Bisoli is an Italian surname. Notable people with the surname include:

 Dimitri Bisoli (born 1994), Italian footballer
 Pierpaolo Bisoli (born 1966), Italian footballer and manager

Italian-language surnames